The Wanting Mare is a 2020 science fiction film written and directed by Nicholas Ashe Bateman.

Plot
In a post-apocalyptic realm called Anmaere, an annual drive ships wild horses from a rundown city called Whithren to another, far-off city, Levithen. Many denizens of Whithren hope to board the boat with the horses and travel to Levithen, which they believe holds a more promising future for them.

Cast
Jordan Monaghan - Moira
 Ashleigh Nutt - young Moira
Christine Kellogg-Darrin - old Moira
Nicholas Ashe Bateman - young Lawrence
Josh Clark - old Lawrence
Yasamin Keshtkar - Eirah
Edmond Cofie - Hadeon
Maxine Muster - Elien

Development
The Wanting Mare is Bateman's first feature-length film; he did not attend film school and worked independently on the film's development, part of which was funded through a campaign on the crowdsourcing website Indiegogo. Shane Carruth was involved with executive production for a time, but he removed his name from the project in 2020 after accusations of abuse against him were made public. Bateman shot much of the film in a storage unit in Paterson, New Jersey; other shots were filmed along the coast of the northeastern United States and in Nova Scotia, Canada.

Reception
The film received a positive review from Wired, and mixed reviews from IndieWire, RogerEbert.com, Variety, and Polygon.

References

External links
 

2020 films
American science fiction drama films
2020s science fiction drama films
2020s English-language films
2020s American films